The Mozart Monument is a monument located in the  in the Innere Stadt district of Vienna, Austria since 1953. It is dedicated to composer Wolfgang Amadeus Mozart (1756–1791).

This 7.5-meter-high statue was made by architect  (1841–1915) and sculptor Viktor Tilgner (1844–1896) and was unveiled at Albrechtsplatz (today ) on April 21, 1896, five days after Tilgner died. Tilgner's signature was completed with his death date.

Description 
The statue features componist Mozart with a music stand. The socle is adorned with ornaments, masks and wreaths and is framed within a semi-circular balustrade made of rough marble from Sterzing. The putti on the socle, which represent the power of Mozart's music, are stylistically suggestive of Art Nouveau.

On the front, a relief refers to two scenes of Mozart's opera Don Giovanni. The back side relief, based on a design by Louis Carmontelle, represents the six-year-old Mozart playing music with his father Leopold and his sister Nannerl.

History 
Funds were raised for a Mozart Monument 77 years before the statue was unveiled. But choosing the design and the location of the monument was problematic. Several proposals included Rathauspark, Stadtpark and Albrechtplatz. Two art competitions were organised to select the design of the monument. Tilgner's design came second in the professional jury's choice, but was selected by the Mozart Monument Committee over Edmund von Hellmer's draft.

The monument was damaged by the bombing of Vienna on March 12, 1945, before it was restored and placed at its actual location in the Burggaten on June 5, 1953. During the restoration, two sand-lime brick columns were added to the monument.

In 1992, the city of Vienna gifted a copy of the monument to Tokyo.

References 

Statues of musicians
Cultural depictions of Wolfgang Amadeus Mozart
Culture in Vienna
1890s architecture
Tourist attractions in Vienna
Buildings and structures in Innere Stadt
1896 establishments in Austria
19th-century architecture in Austria